Paulyn Sun (born Suen Kai-kwan; 11 September 1974), also known as Alien Sun and Pauline Suen, is a Hong Kong-based Singaporean actress.

Background
She became a Champion of the Miss Singapore Universe and represented Singapore at the Miss Universe 1994 but was unplaced. She quit her job in business development to launch an acting career in Hong Kong.

In 1996, she was offered HK$20 million to pose nude and rejected the offer. She was the first female from Singapore to be nominated for a Hong Kong Film Award in 1997 for her role in Island of Greed.

In 2000, she was featured in Wong Kar-wai's award-winning film In The Mood For Love but most of her scenes were not put into the final cut. She has worked in many commercials for ATV and beauty products in an effort to further advance her career. She is lesser known than her acting peers in Hong Kong despite her efforts. She can fluently speak English, Cantonese, Mandarin and Japanese and has used all four languages in her roles.

Sun has said during the DVD documentary for Ichi the Killer that her nickname "Alien Sun" was given to her by classmates in school who made fun of her for having a head that was slightly disproportionately larger than her body during childhood.

In 2012, Sun returned to the media industry after a 10 years break.

Sun has two children with her former boyfriend.

Filmography
 Project Gutenberg (2018)
 The Vanished Murderer (2015)
 Insanity (2015)
 Sara (2015)
Hardcore Comedy (2013)
 May We Chat (2013)
 A Wedding Or A Funeral (2004) - Shirley
 Fu bo (2003)
 Bless The Child (2003)
 Sun Wukong (2002) (TV Series) - The Spider Evil
 Every Dog Has His Date (2001) - Cathy
 The Accidental Spy (2001) - (looking at gym instruments)
 Ichi the Killer (2001) - Karen
 In the Mood for Love (2000) (voice) - Mrs. Chow
 Last Ghost Standing (1999) - Officer Suen
 Troublesome Night 4 (1998) - Apple
 Love & Sex of the Eastern Hollywood (1998) - Selina/Pink
 The Untold Story 2 (1998) - Fung
 Island of Greed (1997) - Tsui Miu-Heung
 Killing Me Hardly (1997) - Starry
 Up for the Rising Sun (1997)
 Mr. Mumble (1996) - Sharon
 Love and Sex Among the Ruins (1996) - Madam Ron
 Lover's Tears (1996) -
 Banana Club (1996) - Vee
 Sixty Million Dollar Man (1995) - Bonnie
 Lover's Tears (1995) - Kam Hing
 The Golden Girls (1995) - May Chu
 Doug's Choice (1994)

References

1974 births
Living people
Miss Universe 1994 contestants
Singaporean beauty pageant winners
Singaporean film actresses
Singaporean expatriates in Hong Kong
Singaporean people of Teochew descent
Singaporean television actresses
20th-century Singaporean actresses
21st-century Singaporean actresses
Singaporean born Hong Kong artists